Five Years in the Life is a Canadian reality television series which aired on CBC Television from 1968 to 1972.

Premise
The lives of selected Canadian families were profiled in this series with the initial intent to revisit them five years later. However, public interest in the series caused the CBC to revisit featured families more frequently and to profile additional families. Profiled people included an architect, an Inuit artist, a Jamaican immigrant and a lighthouse operator from Newfoundland. The various segments were produced with numerous directors.

Scheduling
This half-hour series was broadcast for five seasons as follows (times are Eastern):

References

External links
 

CBC Television original programming
1968 Canadian television series debuts
1972 Canadian television series endings